Ioan Toman (born March 6, 1959 in Teş) is a Romanian skeet shooter. He competed in the mixed skeet shooting at the 1980 Summer Olympics in Moscow, and at the 1992 Summer Olympics in Barcelona, and men's skeet at the 1996 Summer Olympics in Atlanta. Twelve years after competing in his last Olympics, Toman qualified for his fourth Romanian team as a 49-year-old at the 2008 Summer Olympics in Beijing, by winning the silver medal from the 2007 World Shotgun Championships in Nicosia, Cyprus. He placed thirty-fifth out of forty-one shooters in the two-day qualifying rounds of men's skeet, with a total hit of 108 targets.

Olympic results

References

External links
ISSF Profile
NBC 2008 Olympics profile 

Romanian male sport shooters
Living people
Olympic shooters of Romania
Shooters at the 1980 Summer Olympics
Shooters at the 1992 Summer Olympics
Shooters at the 1996 Summer Olympics
Shooters at the 2008 Summer Olympics
1959 births